In enzymology, an aldose beta-D-fructosyltransferase is an enzyme that catalyzes the chemical reaction

alpha-D-aldosyl1 beta-D-fructoside + D-aldose2  D-aldose1 + alpha-D-aldosyl2 beta-D-fructoside

Thus, the two substrates of this enzyme are alpha-D-aldosyl1 beta-D-fructoside and D-aldose2, whereas its two products are D-aldose1 and alpha-D-aldosyl2 beta-D-fructoside.

This enzyme belongs to the family of glycosyltransferases, specifically the hexosyltransferases.  The systematic name of this enzyme class is alpha-D-aldosyl-beta-D-fructoside:aldose 1-beta-D-fructosyltransferase.

References

 

EC 2.4.1
Enzymes of unknown structure